The Abenicio Salazar Historic District, on Camino del Pueblo  (former routing of U.S. Route 85) in Bernalillo, New Mexico, was listed on the National Register of Historic Places in 1980.

It includes the Our Lady of Sorrows High School, a two-story building built in 1922 by local builder Abenicio Salazar (1857-1941).  Abenicio Salazar "built the larqest adobe buildings in the Bernalillo area including this building. He built the flour mill, a fire wall for the lumber mill, the coal mining town of Hagan, and a number of houses", but the school is the only large one surviving in good condition.

It is across the street from NRHP-listed Our Lady of Sorrows Church.

References

External links

National Register of Historic Places in Sandoval County, New Mexico
Neoclassical architecture in New Mexico
Buildings and structures completed in 1874